Bates-Morse Mountain, located in Phippsburg, Maine, is a conservation area owned by the Bates-Morse Mountain Conservation Area Corporation. The terrain encompasses salt marshes and beach, all lined by dense Maine woods. The entirety of the mountain extends from the Sprague River to the Morse River. Seawall Beach is also along the mountain towards the top. The beaches that stretch along the outline of the mountain, are privately owned but are occasionally used, with permission, by the greater public for research, and recreation.

This area is mainly salt marshes and coastal uplands. The college participates in preserving the plants, animals and natural ecosystems within this area as a part of their Community-Engaged Learning Program. Due to overall size, the site is frequently used by other Maine schools such as Bowdoin College for their Nordic Skiing pole walking practices.

References

Protected areas of Maine
Conservation areas of the United States
Bates College